The second season of the Australian police-drama Blue Heelers premiered on the Seven Network on 21 February 1995 and aired on Tuesday nights at 8:30 PM. The 41-episode season concluded 21 November 1995. The cast for this season was the same as that of the preceding season, with the omission of Ann Burbrook as Roz Patterson and with the introduction of Damian Walshe-Howling as Adam Cooper to take her place. This season of Blue Heelers was released on DVD on 1 December 2005 and was released in a two-part release; and later as a complete set.

Casting
The cast for this season was identical to that of the prior season, with the omission of Ann Burbrook as Roz Patterson and with the introduction of Damian Walshe-Howling as Adam Cooper to take her place.

Main cast for this season consisted of:
 John Wood as Sergeant Tom Croydon [full season]
 Julie Nihill as Christine 'Chris' Riley [full season]
 Martin Sacks as Senior Detective Patrick Joseph 'P.J.' Hasham [full season]
 Lisa McCune as Constable Margaret 'Maggie' Doyle [full season]
 William McInnes as Senior Constable Nicholas 'Nick' Schultz [full season]
 Grant Bowler as Constable Wayne Patterson [full season]
 Damian Walshe-Howling as Constable Adam Cooper [full season]

There were no changes to the main cast for this season.

Semi-regular cast members for this season include:
 Peta Doodson as Sergeant → Senior Sergeant Monica Draper
 Beth Buchanan as Susan Croydon
 Michael Isaacs as Clancy Freeman
 Suzi Dougherty as Dr. Mel Carter
 Axl Taylor as Len the barman
 Dennis Miller as Ex-Sergeant Pat Doyle
 Nick Waters as Inspector Ted Faulkner
 Helen Trenos as Celia Donald
 Dale Stevens as Senior Constable / Detective Senior Constable Rose Egan
 Stuart Baker as "Richo"
 Reg Evans as Keith Purvis
 Terry Gill as Chief Superintendent Clive Adamson
 Karen Davitt as Dr. Zoe Hamilton
 Rachel Blakely as Gina Belfanti
 Beverley Evans as Harriet Keppel

Notable guest stars include:
 Robert Grubb as Sergeant Harris
 David Field as Michael "Mick" Doyle
 Maxine Klibingaitis as Judy
 Rebecca Rigg as Kate Kenny
 Hugh Jackman as Brady Jackson
 Libby Tanner as Holly McLeod
 Kris McQuade as Maureen Powers
 Janet Andrewartha as Detective Ryan
 Kerry Armstrong as Sandy Fielding
 Reg Gorman as Freddie
 Lois Collinder as Nina Dwyer
 Kristian Schmid as Aaron Landers
 Jeremy Kewley as Jonathan Ryder
 Gerard Kennedy as Sal D'Angelo
Samuel Johnson as Dennis Cole

Awards

Episodes

DVD release

References

General
 Zuk, T. Blue Heelers: 1995 episode guide, Australian Television Information Archive. Retrieved 1 August 2007.
 TV.com editors. Blue Heelers Episode Guide – Season 2, TV.com. Retrieved 1 August 2007.
Specific

Blue Heelers seasons
1995 Australian television seasons